Kepler-32b (alt. name KOI 952.01) is an extrasolar planet in orbit around its M-dwarf-type star in the Kepler-32 system, constellation of Cygnus. Discovered by planetary transit methods with the Kepler space telescope in January 2012, it presents a semi-major axis of 0.0519 AU and temperature of 559.9 K. 2.2 Earth-radius, a mass of 4.1 MJ,  and an orbital period of 5.9012 days.

See  also
List of planets discovered by the Kepler spacecraft

References

Exoplanets discovered in 2012
32b
Cygnus (constellation)
Transiting exoplanets